Sebastian Israël (born 21 December 1977) is a former French-Israeli footballer.

External links
  Profile and statistics of Sebastian Israël on One.co.il

1977 births
Living people
Israeli Jews
21st-century French Jews
Israeli footballers
French footballers
Jewish French sportspeople
Sektzia Ness Ziona F.C. players
Hapoel Rishon LeZion F.C. players
Hapoel Marmorek F.C. players
Israeli Premier League players
Jewish footballers
Liga Leumit players
French emigrants to Israel
Association football midfielders